Peter Nelton (1853–1936) was a member of the Wisconsin State Assembly.

Biography
Nelton was born on October 13, 1853. He went on to reside on a farm in Chimney Rock, Wisconsin.

Political career
Nelton was elected to the Assembly in 1910. Additionally, he was Chairman of the town board (similar to city council) of Chimney Rock. He was a Democrat.

References

1853 births
1936 deaths
People from Trempealeau County, Wisconsin
Democratic Party members of the Wisconsin State Assembly
Wisconsin city council members
Farmers from Wisconsin